The Zadar Polyptych is an oil-on-panel by Italian artist Vittore Carpaccio, painted around 1480–1490. It is now in the Museum of Sacred Art of the Zadar Cathedral, in southern Croatia. It was commissioned by Martin Mladošić, canon, notary and archpresbyter of Nin from Zadar, for the altar of St. Martin in Zadar Cathedral.

Description
The polyptych includes six panels in two orders. In the central part of the lower register is the titular of the polyptych, St. Martin, flanked by patron saints of Zadar, St. Anastasia and St. Simeon. The upper register consists of paintings of St. Peter, St. Paul, and St. Jerome. According to records from 1746, during visitation by the archbishop Mate Karaman, it can be assumed that a painting of the Blessed Virgin Mary was once in the uppermost register, but it has since been lost. Ornamental frame, originally connecting polyptych paintings, was created by a local master Ivan of Korčula.

The figures are painted on a background with rocky hills, with no unitary treatment of the landscape based on geometric perspective but, as in Gentile Bellini's works, with a series of separate blocks.

Sources 
 Peter Humfrey, Carpaccio, Chaucer Press (2005)
Jadranka Baković, Conservation and Restoration of the Polyptych of St. Martin by Vittore Carpaccio, Croatian Conservation Institute (2017)

See also
Venetian school (art)

External links

Paintings by Vittore Carpaccio

 

1480s paintings
Paintings by Vittore Carpaccio
Paintings in Croatia
Polyptych